Tritania dilloni is a species of beetle in the family Cerambycidae, and the only species in the genus Tritania. It was described by Chalumeau in 1990.

References

Onciderini
Beetles described in 1990